Yunus Pasha (Ottoman Turkish: يونس پاشا ) (died September 13, 1517) was an Ottoman statesman. He was Grand Vizier of the Ottoman Empire for eight months in 1517, serving from January 30 until his death on September 13.

Biography
Yunus was of Albanian, Greek or Bulgarian  origin. He was taken into the devşirme system (taken from his family and converted to Islam in order to become an Ottoman bureaucrat/soldier) at a young age, Yunus was raised to become a Janissary, eventually becoming agha (top commander) of the Janissary corps. In 1511, he became a vizier in the divan (the Ottoman government) and the beylerbey (top provincial administrator) of the Anatolia Eyalet.

Yunus Pasha had a large role in the Ottoman–Mamluk War (1516–17). After the Ottoman victory in the Battle of Marj Dabiq in 1516, Yunus Pasha, with Ottoman troops under his command, mobilized his forces and entered the (modern Syrian) city of Aleppo, from there invading the cities of Hama, Homs, and Damascus in rapid succession. After the 1517 Battle of Ridaniya, he entered the Egyptian city of Cairo with his Janissary forces, and after a three-day siege, captured the city for the Ottoman Empire.

Because of his successes and the death of the previous grand vizier, Hadım Sinan Pasha, in combat during the Battle of Ridaniya on January 22, 1517, Yunus Pasha was appointed grand vizier eight days later, on January 30. Later, he was simultaneously appointed to be the governor of Egypt. After attaining these double positions, Yunus Pasha allegedly set up a syndicate of bribery and extortion. After the news of the corruption reached the sultan Selim I, Yunus Pasha's governorship was revoked and given to Hayır Bey, leaving Yunus Pasha with the sole office of grand vizier.

It is alleged that sultan Selim I had Yunus Pasha executed for insulting his governorship successor Hayır Bey's Circassian ethnicity after bitterness of losing his governorship to him despite Yunus Pasha being the one who had conquered Egypt for the Ottoman Empire. Whatever the reason, Yunus Pasha was executed by decapitation on September 13, 1517.

Personal life
He was married in 1505 to Aslıhan Hanimsultan, daughter of Selçuk Sultan and granddaughter of Sultan Bayezid II.

See also
 List of Ottoman Grand Viziers
 List of Ottoman governors of Egypt

References 

16th-century Grand Viziers of the Ottoman Empire
16th-century Ottoman governors of Egypt
Grand Viziers of Selim I
Ottoman governors of Anatolia
Ottoman governors of Damascus
Ottoman governors of Egypt
Year of birth unknown
1517 deaths
Devshirme
Executed people from the Ottoman Empire
16th-century executions by the Ottoman Empire
People executed by the Ottoman Empire by decapitation
1510s in Egypt
1510s in the Ottoman Empire